The federal state civilian service ranks in Russia were introduced with enactment of the Federal Law of 27 July 2004 No.79-FZ "About state civilian service of Russian Federation".

The state civilian service ranks of the federal subjects of the Russian Federation are established by the Federal Law of 27 July 2004 No.79-FZ "About state civilian service of Russian Federation" and the laws of the federal subjects of the Russian Federation.

The municipal service ranks are established by the Federal Law of 2 March 2007 No.25-FZ "About municipal service in Russian Federation" and the laws of the federal subjects of the Russian Federation.

Patches, stitched over the place for a buttonholes are used as insignia.

Federal ranks and insignia

Regional ranks and insignia

Municipal ranks and insignia

See also
 Diplomatic ranks in Russian Federation
 Prosecutor's ranks in Russian Federation
 Special ranks in Investigative Committee of Russia
 Army ranks and insignia of the Russian Federation
 Naval ranks and insignia of the Russian Federation

References

Federal state civilian service of the Russian Federation
Federal state civilian service ranks in the Russian Federation
Regional state civilian service in the Russian Federation
Regional state civilian service ranks in the Russian Federation
Municipal service in the Russian Federation
Municipal service ranks in the Russian Federation